Benoit Allauzen is a prominent French sommelier living in Hong Kong.

Biography
He is currently studying Mandarin at BLCU after being the sommelier at the prestigious restaurant L'Atelier de Joël Robuchon in Hong Kong, awarded two stars by the Michelin Guide. Allauzen gained attention for his creative use of the iPad instead of a traditional wine list to overlook the largest wine list in the city.

Allauzen was previously the sommelier at several prominent restaurants in London's Mayfair district, including the Greenhouse MARC (one Michelin star) and Morton's Club MARC. The former had a record 3,000 bottle wine list. Allauzen has held the position of head sommelier at Le Pont de la Tour and Orrery, both in London, and at San Francisco's La Folie.

External links
Interview with Allauzen by Jancis Robinson
Interview with Allauzen in the Wall Street Journal
Interview with Allauzen in Harpers
Review Benoit Allauzen - Forbes
Asian Palate - Jeannie Cho Lee MW

References

Living people
Year of birth missing (living people)
Sommeliers